Priandi is one of six parishes (administrative divisions) in Nava, a municipality within the province and autonomous community of Asturias, in northern Spain. In it stands the Iglesia de Santo Tomé (Priandi).

Parishes in Nava